Long Wave is the second solo album recorded by Jeff Lynne. released on 8 October (UK) and 9 October 2012 (US).

The album contains cover versions of songs that influenced Lynne's songwriting while growing up and residing in Birmingham; it was recorded between 2010 and 2012.

The album debuted at number 7 on the UK Albums Chart and at number 1 on the UK Top 40 Independent Albums Chart, then also at number 133 on the US Billboard 200 albums chart, at number 33 on the Billboard Top Independent Albums chart and at number 48 on the Billboard Top Rock Albums chart.

"At Last" was scheduled to be the first UK single and "Mercy Mercy" the first US single issued from the album.

Lynne said of the album:

Track listing 
All songs performed and produced by Jeff Lynne.

Charts

References

Jeff Lynne albums
Albums produced by Jeff Lynne
2012 albums
Covers albums
Frontiers Records albums